Malshanger is a small village in the Basingstoke and Deane district of Hampshire, England. Its nearest town is Basingstoke, which lies approximately 4.5 miles (7.1 km) south-east from the village.

Governance
The village is part of the civil parish of Oakley, and is part of the Oakley and North Waltham ward of Basingstoke and Deane borough council.

Notable people
William Warham, Archbishop of Canterbury

References

Villages in Hampshire